Mary Elizabeth Truss (born 26 July 1975) is a British politician who served as Prime Minister of the United Kingdom and Leader of the Conservative Party from September to October 2022. On her fiftieth day in office, she stepped down amid a government crisis, making her the shortest-serving prime minister in the history of the United Kingdom. Truss previously held various Cabinet positions under prime ministers David Cameron, Theresa May and Boris Johnson, lastly as foreign secretary from 2021 to 2022. She became Member of Parliament (MP) for South West Norfolk in 2010.

Truss attended Merton College, Oxford, and was the president of Oxford University Liberal Democrats. In 1996, she joined the Conservative Party. She worked at Shell and Cable & Wireless, and was the deputy director of the think tank Reform. After two unsuccessful attempts to be elected to the House of Commons, she was elected as the MP for South West Norfolk at the 2010 general election. As a backbencher, she called for reform in several policy areas including childcare, mathematics education and the economy. Truss founded the Free Enterprise Group of Thatcherite Conservative MPs and wrote or co-wrote a number of papers and books, including After the Coalition (2011) and Britannia Unchained (2012).

Truss served as Parliamentary Under-Secretary of State for Childcare and Education from 2012 to 2014, before Cameron appointed her Secretary of State for the Environment, Food and Rural Affairs in his 2014 cabinet reshuffle. Although she supported the Britain Stronger in Europe campaign for the UK to remain in the European Union, Truss supported Brexit after the outcome of the 2016 referendum. Following Cameron's resignation in 2016, his successor May appointed Truss as Secretary of State for Justice and Lord Chancellor, making Truss the first woman to serve as Lord Chancellor in the office's thousand-year history. After the 2017 general election, Truss was appointed Chief Secretary to the Treasury. After May resigned in 2019, Truss supported Johnson's successful bid to become Conservative leader and prime minister, after which he appointed Truss as Secretary of State for International Trade and President of the Board of Trade in July 2019; she subsequently took on the additional role of Minister for Women and Equalities in September 2019. Johnson promoted Truss to Foreign Secretary in the 2021 cabinet reshuffle. During her time in the position, Truss co-chaired the EU–UK Partnership Council, led negotiations on the Northern Ireland Protocol, and was involved in the UK's response to the 2022 Russian invasion of Ukraine.

Truss defeated Rishi Sunak in the Conservative Party leadership election to succeed Johnson, who had resigned in an earlier government crisis. Truss was appointed prime minister by Queen Elizabeth II two days before the monarch's death; her government's business was subsequently suspended during a national mourning period of 10 days. To tackle the cost of living and energy supply crises, Truss's government announced the Energy Price Guarantee to limit energy prices for households, businesses and public-sector organisations. Her government then announced large-scale borrowing and tax cuts in a mini-budget, which was widely criticised and largely reversed, having led to financial instability. Facing mounting criticism and loss of confidence in her leadership, Truss announced her resignation as leader of the Conservative Party; Sunak was elected unopposed as her successor, and replaced her as prime minister. Truss remains in the House of Commons as a backbencher.

Early life 
Mary Elizabeth Truss was born on 26 July 1975 in Oxford, England, to John Truss and Priscilla Truss. She is a descendant of Charles Truss, after whom Truss's Island on the River Thames is named. Truss has three younger brothers, Chris, Patrick and Francis. From an early age, she has been known by her middle name. Her father is an emeritus professor of pure mathematics at the University of Leeds, and her mother was a nurse and teacher. Truss has described her parents as being "to the left of Labour"; her mother was a member of the Campaign for Nuclear Disarmament. When Truss later stood for election to Parliament as a Conservative, her mother agreed to campaign for her, but her father declined to do so. Truss's parents divorced in 2003; at the 2004 Leeds City Council election, her mother unsuccessfully stood for election as a Liberal Democrat.

The family moved to Paisley, Renfrewshire, in Scotland when she was four years old, living there from 1979 to 1985, with Truss attending West Primary School. She then attended Roundhay School, a comprehensive school in the Roundhay area of Leeds, which she later said had "let down" children, a claim disputed by others. Aged 12, she spent a year in Burnaby, British Columbia in Canada, where she attended Parkcrest Elementary School while her father taught at Simon Fraser University. Truss praised what she described as the Canadian coherent curriculum and the attitude that it was "really good to be top of the class", which she contrasts to her education at Roundhay School. Truss was remembered by adolescent classmates as a studious girl with "geeky" friends. She reportedly had an interest in social issues such as homelessness. She read philosophy, politics and economics (PPE) at Merton College, Oxford, graduating in 1996.

Truss was active in the Liberal Democrats. She was president of Oxford University Liberal Democrats and a member of the national executive committee of Liberal Democrat Youth and Students (LDYS). During her time as a Liberal Democrat, Truss supported the legalisation of cannabis and the abolition of the monarchy, and campaigned against the Criminal Justice and Public Order Act 1994.

Truss joined the Conservative Party in 1996.

Professional career 
From 1996 to 2000, Truss worked for Shell, during which time she qualified as a Chartered Management Accountant (ACMA) in 1999. In 2000, Truss was employed by Cable & Wireless and rose to economic director before leaving in 2005.

After losing her first two elections, Truss became the full-time deputy director of Reform in January 2008, where she advocated more rigorous academic standards in schools, a greater focus on tackling serious and organised crime, and urgent action to deal with Britain's falling competitiveness. She co-authored The Value of Mathematics, Fit for Purpose, A New Level, and Back To Black: Budget 2009 Paper, among other reports.

Political career 
Truss served as the chair of the Lewisham Deptford Conservative Association from 1998 to 2000. Truss unsuccessfully contested the Greenwich London Borough Council elections in 1998 (for Vanbrugh ward) and 2002 (in Blackheath Westcombe). On 4 May 2006, she was elected as a councillor for Eltham South in the 2006 Greenwich London Borough Council election. Truss did not seek re-election to the council on 6 May 2010, with the 2010 UK general election being announced on 6 April 2010, the Dissolution of Parliament on 12 April 2010 and the last day to file MP nomination papers 20 April 2010.

Parliamentary candidatures 
At the 2001 UK general election, Truss stood for the constituency of Hemsworth in West Yorkshire, a safe seat for the Labour Party. She came a distant second, but increased the Conservative vote by 3.2%. Before the 2005 UK general election, the parliamentary candidate for Calder Valley, Sue Catling, was pressured to resign by the local Conservative Association, whereupon Truss was selected to fight the seat, which is also in West Yorkshire. Truss narrowly lost the election to the Labour Party incumbent.

Under David Cameron as Conservative leader, Truss was added to the party's "A List". In October 2009, she was selected for the South West Norfolk seat by members of the constituency Conservative Association. She won over 50% of the vote in the first round of the final against five other candidates. Shortly after her selection, some members of the constituency association objected to Truss's selection, due to her failing to declare a prior affair with the married Conservative MP Mark Field. A motion was proposed to terminate Truss's candidature, but this was defeated by 132 votes to 37 at a general meeting of the association's members three weeks later.

Parliamentary career
Following her election to the House of Commons on 6 May 2010, Truss campaigned for issues including the retention of the RAF Tornado base at RAF Marham in her constituency; over seven months she asked 13 questions in the Commons about RAF Marham, secured a special debate on the subject, wrote dozens of letters to ministers and collected signatures on a petition which was delivered to Downing Street. From the start of her parliamentary career, she also lobbied for the dualling of the A11 west of Thetford; the work was completed in 2014. "With an eye on Thetford Forest, in her constituency, she spoke out against the proposal to sell off forests" and played "a leading role" in preventing a waste incinerator being built at King's Lynn.

In March 2011, Truss wrote a paper for the liberal think tank CentreForum in which she argued for an end to bias against serious academic subjects in the education system so that social mobility can be improved. Truss wrote a further paper for the same think tank in May 2012, in which she argued for change in the structure of the childcare market in Britain.

In October 2011, Truss founded the Free Enterprise Group, which has been supported by over 40 other Conservative MPs. In September 2011, together with four other members of the Free Enterprise Group, she had co-authored After the Coalition, a book which sought to challenge the consensus that Britain's economic decline is inevitable by arguing for the return of a more entrepreneurial and meritocratic culture.

Britannia Unchained was published on 13 September 2012 by the same authors as above. In Chapter 4, which is named "Work Ethic" (page 61), the book states: "Once they enter the workplace, the British are among the worst idlers in the world. We work among the lowest hours, we retire early and our productivity is poor." During a BBC leadership debate in July 2022, Truss said that the authors had each written a different chapter of the book and that Dominic Raab had written chapter 4 which contains those claims. Raab later remarked that the authors had taken "collective responsibility" for the book. As part of a serialisation in The Daily Telegraph, Truss wrote an article previewing Britannia Unchained. The book was promoted by its publishers as the work of "the Conservative Party's rising stars".

Truss has championed Britain following Germany's lead in allowing people to have tax-free and less heavily regulated "mini-jobs". Since Truss published a paper on the policy for the Free Enterprise Group in February 2012, the policy has been examined by the Treasury as a policy to promote growth.

Truss has campaigned for improved teaching of more rigorous school subjects, especially mathematics. She noted in 2012 that only 20% of British students studied maths to 18, and called for maths classes to be compulsory for all those in full-time education. Truss herself studied maths and further maths at A level. She argued in 2011 that comprehensive school pupils were being "mis-sold" easy, low-value subjects to boost school results: comprehensive school pupils were six times as likely to take media studies at A-level as privately educated pupils. Truss also criticised the over-reliance on calculators to the detriment of mental arithmetic.

From March 2011, Truss was a Member of the Justice Select Committee, remaining on the committee until her appointment as a government minister.

Ministerial career

Junior ministerial career (2012–2014) 
On 4 September 2012, Truss was appointed as Parliamentary Under-Secretary of State at the Department for Education, responsible for childcare and early learning, assessment, qualifications, curriculum reform, behaviour and attendance, and school food review. In this role, she developed some of the policy areas that she had pursued as a backbencher.

In January 2013, she announced proposals to reform A-Levels, by concentrating examinations at the end of two-year courses. She sought to improve British standards in maths for fear that children are falling behind those in Asian countries, and led a fact-finding visit to schools and teacher-training centres in Shanghai in February 2014 to see how children there have become the best in the world at maths.

Truss also outlined plans to reform childcare in England, which would overhaul childcare qualifications and increase the maximum number of children relative to adults in a care establishment, with the intention of widening the availability of childcare along with increasing pay and qualifications among staff. The proposed reforms were broadly welcomed by some organisations such as the charity 4Children, the Confederation of British Industry and the College of West Anglia. The proposals met opposition from others. The TUC general secretary Frances O'Grady and the then Shadow Education Secretary Stephen Twigg were among those criticising the reforms, and were echoed by some parents and childcare bodies, such as the charity National Day Nurseries Association.

The columnist Polly Toynbee was highly critical of the minister's plans and challenged Truss to demonstrate how to care for two babies alongside four toddlers on her own. Truss responded to Toynbee's challenge by saying that being an early educator was a very demanding job, requiring great and specialist expertise, for which she was not trained. In the event, aspects of the reforms relating to relaxation of childcare ratios were blocked by the Deputy Prime Minister Nick Clegg, who said: "The response, not just from nurseries, but overwhelmingly from parent groups was they thought this was a bad idea."

Environment Secretary (2014–2016) 

In a 15 July 2014 cabinet reshuffle, Truss was appointed Secretary of State for Environment, Food and Rural affairs, replacing Owen Paterson. In apparent contrast to her predecessor, Truss declared that she fully believed that climate change is happening, and that "human beings have contributed to that". She became a member of the Privy Council the next day.

At the Conservative Party conference in September 2014, Truss made a speech in which she said "We import two-thirds of our cheese, that is a disgrace" and "In December, I'll be in Beijing, opening up new pork markets." The awkwardness of her delivery led her to be widely mocked, and clips of the speech went viral.

In November 2014, Truss launched a new 10-year bee and pollinator strategy to try to reverse the trend of falling bee populations, including a strategy to revive traditional meadows which provide the most fertile habitat for pollinators. In July 2015, she approved the limited temporary lifting of an EU ban on the use of two neonicotinoid pesticides, enabling their use for 120 days on about 5% of England's oilseed rape crop to ward off the cabbage-stem flea beetle; campaigners in 2012 warned that pesticides were shown to harm bees by damaging their renowned ability to navigate home.

Truss cut taxpayer subsidies for solar panels on agricultural land, as her view was that the land could be better used to grow crops, food and vegetables. She described farming and food as "hotbeds of innovation" and promoted the production and export of British food.

In March 2015, she was one of two cabinet ministers to vote against the government's successful proposal to introduce plain packaging for cigarettes, in what was technically a free vote.

Justice Secretary and Lord Chancellor (2016–2017)

On 14 July 2016, Truss was appointed as Secretary of State for Justice and Lord Chancellor in the First May ministry. Truss became the first woman to hold either position and the first female Lord Chancellor in the thousand-year history of the office. May's decision to appoint her was criticised by the then Minister of State for Justice Lord Faulks, who resigned from the government, questioning whether Truss would have the clout to be able to stand up to the prime minister when necessary, on behalf of the judges. Truss herself said that he did not contact her before going public with his criticism, and she had never met or spoken to him.

In November 2016, Truss was further criticised, including by the former Attorney General Dominic Grieve and the Criminal Bar Association, for failing to support more robustly the judiciary and the principle of judicial independence, after three judges of the Divisional Court came under attack from politicians and from the Daily Mail for ruling against the government in R (Miller) v Secretary of State for Exiting the European Union. Lord Falconer, the former Lord Chancellor, who had previously suggested that, like her immediate predecessors Chris Grayling and Michael Gove, Truss lacked the essential legal expertise that the constitution requires, called for her to be sacked as Justice Secretary as her perceived inadequate response "signals to the judges that they have lost their constitutional protector".

Truss denied she had failed to defend the judges. "An independent judiciary is the cornerstone of the rule of law, vital to our constitution and freedoms", she wrote. "It is my duty as Lord Chancellor to defend that independence. I swore to do so under my oath of office. I take that very seriously, and I will always do so." She also said that the independent judiciary was robust enough to withstand attack by The Daily Telegraph and Daily Mail. In March 2017, the Lord Chief Justice, Lord Thomas of Cwmgiedd, told the House of Lords constitution select committee that Truss was "completely and utterly wrong" to say she could not criticise the media and reiterated the importance of protecting judges.

Following a significant rise in prison violence incidents in 2015 and 2016, in November 2016 Truss announced a £1.3 billion investment programme in the prison service and the recruitment of 2,500 additional prison officers, partly reversing the cuts made under the previous coalition government.

Chief Secretary to the Treasury (2017–2019)
Following the 2017 UK general election, Truss was moved on 11 June to the position of Chief Secretary to the Treasury, attending the cabinet but not a full member of it, in what was seen by some as a demotion.

Truss developed an enthusiasm for cultivating her presence on Twitter and Instagram. The Times described this as an unorthodox approach that had won her fans. She was also closely involved in the launch of the free market campaign group, Freer. Some of her civil servants were reported as finding her tenure as chief secretary "exhausting", because of her demanding work schedule and her habit of asking officials multiplication questions at random intervals.

In June 2018, Truss gave a speech outlining her declared commitment to freedom and individual liberty. She criticised regulations that get in the way of people's lives and warned that raising taxes could see the Conservatives being "crushed" at the polls; in particular, she criticised ministerial colleagues who she said should realise "that it's not macho just to demand more money. It's much tougher to demand better value and challenge the blob of vested interests within your department".

In 2019, Truss declared that she could be a candidate for the leadership of the Conservative Party to succeed May. She ultimately elected not to stand, and instead endorsed Johnson.

International Trade Secretary (2019–2021)
After Johnson became Prime Minister, Truss was tipped for promotion in return for her support during his leadership campaign, during which she advised Johnson on economic policy, and was the architect of plans to cut taxes for people earning over £50,000. Consequently, it was thought she would be appointed Chancellor of the Exchequer or Business Secretary, but she was instead promoted to the position of Secretary of State for International Trade and President of the Board of Trade. Following the resignation of Amber Rudd, Truss was additionally appointed Minister for Women and Equalities.

Twice in September 2019, Truss said that the Department for International Trade had "inadvertently" allowed shipping of radio spares and an air cooler to Saudi Arabia in contravention of an order of the Court of Appeal, which found that UK arms sales to Saudi Arabia for use in the war in Yemen were unlawful. While Truss apologised to a Commons committee on arms export controls, opposition MPs said her apology was insufficient and called for her to resign for breaking the law.

On 19 March 2020, Truss introduced to Parliament the Trade Act 2021, which established the legal framework for the UK to conduct trade deals with nations around the world.

On 7 July 2020, Truss announced the lifting of a year-long ban on the export of arms and military equipment to Saudi Arabia. She said that "there is not a clear risk that the export of arms and military equipment to Saudi Arabia might be used in the commission of a serious violation of international humanitarian law."

In August 2020, a number of meetings Truss held with the Institute of Economic Affairs were removed from the public record because they were recategorised as "personal discussions", which the Labour Party said raised concerns about integrity, transparency and honesty in public office.

Truss undertook negotiations for a post-Brexit free trade agreement between the UK and Japan. An agreement between the two countries was struck in September 2020, which Truss said would result in "99% of exports to Japan" being "tariff-free". It was the first major trade deal the UK had signed since leaving the European Union and was hailed as a "historic moment" by Truss; it mostly copied the existing trade deal the EU had agreed with Japan. This was followed by newly negotiated trade deals with Australia, New Zealand, Norway, Iceland and Liechtenstein.

In December 2020, Truss made a speech on equality policy in which she stated that the UK focused too heavily on "fashionable" race, sexuality, and gender issues at the expense of poverty and geographical disparity. In the speech, she announced that the government and civil service would no longer be receiving unconscious bias training.

Foreign Secretary (2021–2022) 

On 15 September 2021 during a cabinet reshuffle, Johnson promoted Truss from International Trade Secretary to Secretary of State for Foreign, Commonwealth and Development affairs.

At the 2021 United Nations Climate Change Conference in Glasgow, she said that France had acted unacceptably during the Jersey fishing dispute.

In October 2021, she called on Russia to intervene in the Belarus–European Union border crisis and said she wanted a "closer trading and investment relationship" with the Gulf Cooperation Council which includes Saudi Arabia and Qatar. In November 2021, Truss and her Israeli counterpart Yair Lapid announced a new decade-long deal aimed at stopping Iran from developing nuclear weapons. In December 2021, she met her Russian counterpart Sergey Lavrov in Stockholm, urging Russia to seek peace in Ukraine in the context of the Russo-Ukrainian War.

On 5 November 2021, she called for a ceasefire in the Tigray War between Ethiopian rebel groups and the Ethiopian government led by Abiy Ahmed, saying that "there is no military solution and that negotiations are needed to avoid bloodshed and deliver lasting peace".

In January 2022, the former Australian prime minister Paul Keating, who serves on the international board of the China Development Bank, accused Truss of making "demented" comments about Chinese military aggression in the Pacific, saying that "Britain suffers delusions of grandeur and relevance deprivation".Truss was appointed in December 2021 as the British Government's chief negotiator with the EU, following the resignation of Lord Frost. On 30 January 2022, she told the BBC's Sunday Morning programme that "we are supplying and offering extra support into our Baltic allies across the Black Sea, as well as supplying the Ukrainians with defensive weapons". The Russian diplomat Maria Zakharova commented, using social media, that the Baltic states are located on or near the Baltic Sea and not the Black Sea, which is 700 miles away from the Baltic. Truss's scheduled trip to Ukraine was cancelled after she tested positive for COVID-19 on 31 January 2022.

On 6 February 2022, Truss warned that "China must respect the Falklands' sovereignty" and defended the Falkland Islands as "part of the British family" after China backed Argentina's claim over islands.

In October 2022, it was revealed that Truss's phone was hacked during her service as the foreign minister with Russian spies under suspicion for the act.

Russia and Ukraine 
On 10 February 2022, Truss again met Lavrov. In the context of tensions between Russia and the West over a build-up of Russian troops near the Russia–Ukraine border, talks between the two foreign ministers were described as "difficult". Lavrov described the discussion as "turning out like the conversation of a mute and a deaf person". He dismissed "demands to remove Russian troops from Russian territory" as "regrettable" and asked Truss if she recognised Russia's sovereignty over the Voronezh and Rostov regions, two Russian provinces where Russian troops were deployed. Later that day, the Foreign, Commonwealth and Development Office prepared legislation to allow for more sanctions on Russian organisations and individuals. On 21 February 2022, Truss condemned Russia's diplomatic recognition of two self-proclaimed separatist republics in the Donbas in Ukraine. She also stated that the British government would announce new sanctions against Russia.Following Russia's invasion of Ukraine on 24 February, Truss was asked in a BBC interview on 27 February about a call from Ukrainian President Volodymyr Zelenskyy for foreigners to join the newly formed International Legion of Territorial Defense of Ukraine, and if she supported British volunteers joining, to which she responded: "Absolutely, if that is what they want to do". The comments were criticised by some Conservative colleagues, including former Attorney General Dominic Grieve, who said that while "the comments of the foreign secretary may be entirely honourable and understandable", people going to Ukraine to fight without formal licences from the UK government would be in breach of the Foreign Enlistment Act 1870 and committing a criminal offence. Following the Russian military's being placed on high nuclear alert on 27 February, Russian officials said it was in response to Truss's comments. Boris Johnson's spokesperson later stated that British citizens should not travel to Ukraine to fight the Russians and dismissed a claim by the Kremlin that comments from Truss prompted the nuclear alert.

At the end of February, Truss called on the G7 countries to limit the import of oil and natural gas from Russia. She said the Russo-Ukrainian War could "last for years" and that it could mark the "beginning of the end" for Putin. In March, Truss said it was necessary to "work with all of our allies around the world", including Saudi Arabia, so that the UK is no longer "dependent" on Russia for oil and natural gas. She wanted to push Russia's economy "back into the Soviet era". On 27 April 2022, Truss said that Western allies, including the UK, must "double down" and "keep going further and faster" to "push Russia out of the whole of Ukraine", including Crimea. In July 2022, she blamed Putin for the emerging global energy and food crises.

July 2022 Conservative Party leadership election 

On 10 July 2022, Truss announced her intention to run in the Conservative Party leadership election to replace Boris Johnson. She pledged to cut taxes on day one if elected, and said she would "fight the election as a Conservative and govern as a Conservative", adding that she would also take "immediate action to help people deal with the cost of living". She said she would cancel a planned rise in corporation tax and reverse the recent increase in National Insurance rates, funded by delaying the date by which the national debt is planned to fall, as part of a "long-term plan to bring down the size of the state and the tax burden".

On 20 July, Truss and former chancellor of the Exchequer Rishi Sunak were chosen by Conservative Party MPs to be put forward to the membership for the final leadership vote. She finished second in the final MPs ballot, receiving 113 votes to Sunak's 137 votes. In the membership vote, it was announced on 5 September that 57.4% of ballots were for Truss, making her the new leader.

Prime Minister (2022) 

As the elected leader of the Conservatives, the majority party in Parliament, Truss was appointed the new Prime Minister by Queen Elizabeth II at Balmoral Castle on 6 September 2022.

Cabinet

Truss began appointing her cabinet and to other government positions on 6 September 2022. With the appointment of Kwasi Kwarteng as Chancellor of the Exchequer, James Cleverly as Foreign Secretary, and Suella Braverman as Home Secretary, for the first time in British political history, no white men held positions in the Great Offices of State.

Other key appointments included Thérèse Coffey as Deputy Prime Minister and Health Secretary, Brandon Lewis as Justice Secretary, Nadhim Zahawi as Chancellor of the Duchy of Lancaster, Chris Heaton-Harris as Northern Ireland Secretary, Jake Berry as Minister without Portfolio and Party chairman, Jacob Rees-Mogg as Business Secretary, Simon Clarke as Housing Secretary, Kemi Badenoch as Secretary of State for International Trade, Chloe Smith as Work and Pensions Secretary, Kit Malthouse as Education Secretary, Ranil Jayawardena as Environment Secretary, Anne-Marie Trevelyan as Transport Secretary, and Michael Ellis as Attorney General for England and Wales.

Truss retained Ben Wallace as Defence Secretary, Alok Sharma as President for COP26, Alister Jack as Scotland Secretary, Robert Buckland as Wales Secretary, and James Heappey as Minister of State for the Armed Forces and Veterans.

Death of Queen Elizabeth II 

Truss was the fifteenth and final British Prime Minister to serve under Queen Elizabeth II, with the latter dying two days after appointing Truss as Prime Minister. Queen Elizabeth II's death at the age of 96 was announced by Buckingham Palace on 8 September 2022 at 18:30. Truss delivered a statement outside 10 Downing Street paying tribute to the Queen, stating that "Queen Elizabeth II was the rock on which modern Britain was built." Around this time, a 1994 clip emerged of Truss branding the monarchy "disgraceful" and advocating for republicanism when she was the president of the Oxford University Liberal Democrats.

On 9 September, the House of Commons began two days of special tributes to the Queen and started the suspension of Parliament until 21 September during the national mourning period. On 10 September, Truss attended the Accession Ceremony of King Charles III and took an oath of allegiance to the King with fellow senior MPs. On 12 September, Charles III addressed Parliament for the first time as monarch. Truss attended the state funeral of Queen Elizabeth II at Westminster Abbey on 19 September 2022, where she read a lesson during the service.

Domestic policies
Shortly after her appointment, and in response to the cost of living crisis, Truss announced a two-year cap on the price per unit for domestic energy supplies called the Energy Price Guarantee, which the government said would cap average household energy bills at £2,500 per year, while costing the state between £70 and £140 billion.

On 23 September 2022, Kwarteng announced a controversial mini-budget encapsulating Trussonomics, which proposed cutting taxation significantly, abolishing the 45% top income tax rate, cutting the basic rate of income tax, cancelling rises in national insurance contributions and corporation tax, abolishing the proposed Health and Social Care Levy, and cutting stamp duty, policies that were to be funded by borrowing. The budget was poorly received by financial markets, blamed for a rapid fall in the value of the pound, and prompted a response from the Bank of England. The budget was criticised by the International Monetary Fund, US President Joe Biden, the opposition Labour Party and many within Truss's party, including senior politicians Michael Gove and Grant Shapps. It was highly unpopular with the public, and contributed to a large fall in popularity of the Conservative party and for Truss personally.

After initially defending the mini-budget, Truss instructed Kwarteng to reverse the abolition of the 45% income tax additional rate on 3 October. She later reversed the cut in corporation tax and sacked Kwarteng, replacing him with Jeremy Hunt on 14 October. Hunt reversed the remaining policies announced in the mini-budget, with the exception of the cuts to national insurance contributions and the raising of the stamp duty threshold. Hunt also reduced the Energy Price Guarantee from two years to six months.

Foreign policy 

During her first three weeks as prime minister, Truss had "a speaking role before hundreds of world leaders" at the Queen's funeral, and held "a round of diplomatic meetings on the sideline" at the United Nations General Assembly on 21 September, as well as giving a speech in which she said that she wanted people to keep more of their earnings.

Resignation 

On 20 October 2022 and her 45th day in office, Truss announced her resignation as leader of the Conservative Party and her intention to resign as prime minister saying that "given the situation, I cannot deliver the mandate on which I was elected by the Conservative Party." In the same announcement, Truss said that after speaking with the chairman of the 1922 Committee, Sir Graham Brady, they both agreed that there would be a leadership election "to be completed within the next week". Her resignation as prime minister was accepted by Charles III at an audience at Buckingham Palace. She was succeeded by Rishi Sunak as leader of the Conservative Party on 24 October, and advised Charles III to summon Sunak for an audience and for appointment as the new prime minister on 25 October. She became the shortest-serving prime minister of the United Kingdom in history.

Truss said that she would remain in the House of Commons as a backbencher. The short length of her premiership was the subject of much ridicule, including a livestream of a head of lettuce comparing the shelf-life of the vegetable to her remaining tenure.

Political positions

Economics 
Truss is known for her economically liberal views and her support for free trade. She supports the neoliberal philosophy of supply-side economics, often referred to derogatorily as "trickle-down economics". She founded the Free Enterprise Group of Conservative MPs, a pro-free market collection of parliamentarians arguing for a more entrepreneurial economy and fewer employment laws. After the September 2022 mini-budget, Truss fired her Chancellor of the Exchequer, Kwasi Kwarteng, after 38 days in office. She replaced him with Jeremy Hunt, leading Faisal Islam of BBC News to write that "Trussonomics" is effectively dead.

Foreign policy

Truss was described as a hawkish foreign secretary. She has called for Britain to reduce economic dependency on China and Russia and has supported certain diplomatic and economic sanctions imposed by the British government against China, including barring the Chinese ambassador to the UK Zheng Zeguang from entering Parliament, in response to China's retaliatory sanctions due to Xinjiang. She accused Rishi Sunak of "seeking closer economic relations" with China. Truss has been a strong supporter of Taiwan in the context of deteriorating cross strait relations, but, citing precedent, has said she would not visit the island nation if she was elected prime minister. She described the Chinese government's treatment of the Uyghur people as "genocide".

She stated that the UK and Turkey are "key European NATO allies" and called for UK–Turkey cooperation on "energy, defence and security" to be deepened. Truss said she would continue to support Cyprus in its "efforts for reunification under international law and in helping find a peaceful and lasting solution" to the Cyprus conflict between Greek Cypriots and Turkish-backed Turkish Cypriot separatists.

In 2022 she called Saudi Arabia an "ally", but said she was not "condoning" the country's policies. Truss promised to "review" moving the British embassy in Israel from Tel Aviv to Jerusalem.

Brexit 

Truss supported the United Kingdom's remaining in the European Union during the 2016 referendum.

Since the referendum, Truss has supported Brexit; in 2017, she said that if another referendum were held, she would vote for Brexit, saying: "I believed there would be massive economic problems but those haven't come to pass and I've also seen the opportunities." In the July 2022 Conservative Party leadership election, Truss said of her support for Remain that "I was wrong and I am prepared to admit I was wrong". She added that "some of the portents of doom didn't happen and instead we have actually unleashed new opportunities" after Brexit. Her support of Brexit during these debates made her popular with the Conservative party members who selected her as prime minister during this leadership election.

Social and cultural issues 
On culture, Truss has said that the Conservative Party should "reject the zero-sum game of identity politics, we reject the illiberalism of cancel culture, and we reject the soft bigotry of low expectations that holds so many people back". She has also suggested that Britain should not ignore the history of the British Empire, but should embrace the country's history "warts and all" if it is to compete with hostile states. In 2021, Truss voted to decriminalise abortion in Northern Ireland and abstained from voting on the introduction of "buffer zones" outside of abortion clinics.

On LGBTQ+ rights, Truss, according to Reuters, voted for gay marriage and has never voted against LGBTQ+ rights, but has also moved to limit transgender rights. She spoke against gender self-identification, stating that "medical checks are important". She said that she agreed that "only women have a cervix". She also stated that the government departments should withdraw from Stonewall's diversity champions scheme. Despite initially supporting single-sex services being restricted on the basis of biological sex, she later said in February 2022 that the Government was not interested in enacting such a measure.

Energy and environment

As environment secretary, Truss supported a new strategy on bees and other pollinators, and advocated for gardeners to reduce lawnmower use to reduce impacts on them (see Environment Secretary section for more details).

Truss signed the Conservative Environment Pledge on the website of the Conservative Environment Network (CEN), which has the support of 127 Conservative MPs. By signing the CEN pledge, Truss committed to achieving the UK's net-zero target on reducing greenhouse gas emissions by 2050 and in 2022, said that she wanted to do this "in a way that doesn't harm businesses or consumers". As part of the energy crisis measures, a temporary suspension of green levies on domestic bills starting on 1 October was announced by the Government, with schemes previously funded by the levies now being funded by government.

As reported in The Daily Telegraph, Truss planned to scrap an environmental rule called the "nutrient neutrality" requirement. This rule requires details from the developers about how their proposals might pollute rivers and wetlands and is implemented by the non-departmental public body Natural England. UK Government support for nutrient neutrality is outlined in a policy paper from March 2022 "Nutrient pollution: reducing the impact on protected sites".

As part of a two-year plan to ensure British energy security, Truss's government issued the 33rd round of offshore licences on 7 October 2022 (the first since 2019–2020) with as many as 100 set to be awarded. Nearly 900 locations are being offered for exploration, with a fast-track for parts of the North Sea near existing infrastructure. Opposition has come from Greenpeace, among others, who say that this energy policy benefits fossil-fuel companies and will have little impact on prices.

The ban on fracking for shale gas was lifted in September 2022 as the moratorium in place since 2019 was scrapped. The lifting of the ban has given companies the go-ahead to apply for planning permission to extract shale gas in the U.K. Fracking was banned by the government in November 2019 after a report by the Oil and Gas Authority found that it was not possible at that time to predict the probability or strength of earthquakes caused by fracking.

While PM, Truss was wanting to ban solar farms from about 58% of agricultural land. In October 2022, her spokesperson confirmed that plans to ban solar farming from agricultural land were going ahead. While not against the use of solar panels, in August 2022 Truss said that she thought that it was "one of the most depressing sights" to see fields full of solar panels, instead of being full of crops or livestock. She has proposed that solar panel use should be restricted to commercial roofs.

Truss has supported the construction of small modular reactors and large nuclear power facilities in different parts of the United Kingdom. While foreign secretary, she cautioned against Chinese involvement in British infrastructure, including nuclear power stations.

As outlined in the Government's Hydrogen Strategy and included as part of Truss's energy crisis solutions, building hydrogen production facilities was to be a key part of the UK energy supply. A company has been given the green light to build a 6 Megawatt electrolyser at the Sizewell nuclear power stations site and will involve the Freeport East Hydrogen Hub in Felixstowe/Harwich. Hydrogen production can involve water generation, called "green", or fossil fuel generation, called "grey" and "blue".

A press release from Truss and the FCDO, after the COP26 summit in Glasgow, ended by saying that the UK was committed to supporting green enterprises and would help countries globally to deliver green, sustainable growth and economic development, while a statement by Truss at the end of a G7 foreign and development ministers' meeting in December 2021 outlined a commitment from them to work together to keep to the COP27 target for limiting global warming to 1.5 degrees.

As part of the Growth Plan set out by Government in September 2022, proposals were made to limit the ability of councils in England to block the construction of onshore  windfarms, a reversal of policy implemented in 2016 as part of the National Planning Policy Framework. The Government said that it would bring UK planning policy for onshore wind farming in line with existing rules, which could allow infrastructure to be more easily deployed.

Personal life 
In 2000, Truss married Hugh O'Leary, a fellow accountant; the couple have two daughters. From 2004 until mid-2005, she had an extramarital affair with the married MP Mark Field, whom the Conservative Party had appointed as her political mentor. She remains married to O'Leary.

In 2022, Truss said: "I share the values of the Christian faith and the Church of England, but I'm not a regular practising religious person."

Publications

Explanatory notes

References

External links 

 
 
 

|-

|-

|-

|-

|-

|-

|-

|-

|-

|-

|-

|-

|-

|-

 
1975 births
21st-century English women politicians
Prime Ministers of the United Kingdom
21st-century prime ministers of the United Kingdom
Alumni of Merton College, Oxford
British Secretaries of State for Foreign and Commonwealth Affairs
British Secretaries of State for the Environment
Chief Secretaries to the Treasury
Conservative Party (UK) councillors
Conservative Party (UK) MPs for English constituencies
Conservative Party prime ministers of the United Kingdom
Councillors in the Royal Borough of Greenwich
English accountants
Female foreign ministers
Female justice ministers
Female members of the Cabinet of the United Kingdom
Female members of the Parliament of the United Kingdom for English constituencies
Free Enterprise Group
Leaders of the Conservative Party (UK)
Liberal Democrats (UK) officials
Living people
Lord chancellors of Great Britain
Members of the Privy Council of the United Kingdom
Ministers for Women and Equalities
People educated at Roundhay School
Politicians from Oxford
Presidents of the Board of Trade
Secretaries of State for Justice (UK)
Truss family
UK MPs 2010–2015
UK MPs 2015–2017
UK MPs 2017–2019
UK MPs 2019–present
Women councillors in England
Women Prime Ministers of the United Kingdom
Women's ministers of the United Kingdom